Villadsen is a Danish surname. Notable people with the surname include:

 Mai Villadsen (born 1991), Danish politician
 Thomas Villadsen (born 1984), Danish footballer
 Trine Villadsen (born 1995), Danish badminton player

Surnames of Danish origin
Danish-language surnames